Gérard-Raymond Morin (born January 17, 1940) is a Quebec politician. He served as the member for Dubuc in the Quebec National Assembly as a member of the Parti Québécois from 1989 until 1998.

Biography
Morin graduated in commerce from the Collège Saint-Joseph in La Baie in 1958. He was employed at Consolidated-Bathurst as a paper-maker.

He was the President of the Consolidated-Bathurst Plant National Union from 1976 to 1982.

Political career

Morin was a municipal councilor from 1980 to 1984 and then became Mayor of La Baie from 1984 to 1988. He ran in Dubuc in 1989 and won, he was re-elected without any difficulty in 1994 as the Parti Québécois formed the government

He was Parliamentary Secretary to the Minister responsible for the Saguenay-Lac-Saint-Jean region in the Bouchard government.

He did not seek re-election in 1998.

Electoral record

Provincial

References 

1947 births
Living people
French Quebecers
Mayors of places in Quebec
Parti Québécois MNAs
Saguenay, Quebec city councillors
Quebec municipal councillors
Trade unionists from Quebec
20th-century Canadian politicians